Jura Kola (also Romanized as Jūrā Kolā) is a village in Harazpey-ye Gharbi Rural District, in the Central District of Mahmudabad County, Mazandaran Province, Iran. As of the 2006 census, its population was 426, in 69 families.

References 

Populated places in Mahmudabad County